Roan Parish Church (Fosen Cathedral) is a parish church of the Church of Norway in Åfjord municipality in Trøndelag county, Norway. It is located in the village of Roan. It is the church for Roan parish which is part of the Fosen prosti (deanery) in the Diocese of Nidaros of the (Evangelical, Lutheran) Church of Norway. The white, stone structure was built in the Basilica style in 1702 to the designs of architect Morten Jørgensen Bjørnør. The church seats about 450 people.

History

The earliest historical record of a church building on this site dates back to the year 1499, but this was not the year of the current church's construction. On 7 February 1690, the old church suffered fire damage and was likely repaired afterwards.

Election church
In 1814, the current church served as an election church. Together with more than 300 other parish churches throughout Norway, it served as a polling station for the country's first national elections to the 1814 Norwegian Constituent Assembly which was responsible for writing the Constitution of Norway. Each ecclesiastical parish was a constituency which selected "electors" who later met together, in each county, to choose the representatives for the Eidsvoll assembly which was to meet later that same year.

See also
List of churches in Nidaros

References

Åfjord
Churches in Trøndelag
Long churches in Norway
Stone churches in Norway
18th-century Church of Norway church buildings
Churches completed in 1702
14th-century establishments in Norway
Norwegian election church